Alan Tennant (30 September 1930 – 20 February 1997) was an English professional rugby league footballer who played in the 1940s and 1950s.

Playing career

Tennant made his début for Featherstone Rovers against Dewsbury at Crown Flatt, Dewsbury on Saturday 25 December 1948, and he played his last match for Featherstone Rovers against Huddersfield during December 1959.

Challenge Cup Final appearances
Tennant played left-, i.e. number 4, in Featherstone Rovers' 12-18 defeat by Workington Town in the 1952 Challenge Cup Final during the 1951–52 season at Wembley Stadium, London on Saturday 19 April 1952, in front of a crowd of 72,093.

Testimonial match
Tennant's benefit season at Featherstone Rovers took place during the 1958–59 season.

References

1930 births
1997 deaths
English rugby league players
Featherstone Rovers players
Rugby league centres